Johnathan Richard Buck (born July 7, 1980) is an American  former professional baseball catcher. He played in Major League Baseball (MLB) for the Kansas City Royals, Toronto Blue Jays, Florida/Miami Marlins, New York Mets, Pittsburgh Pirates, Seattle Mariners and Los Angeles Angels of Anaheim. He went to high school in Taylorsville, Utah.

Career

Houston Astros
Buck was initially drafted by the Houston Astros in the 7th round of the 1998 Amateur Draft.  He was signed to a minor league contract on June 11, 1998.

By 2002, Buck was highly regarded for his defensive ability, becoming one of the game's top minor league catchers and 68th top prospect in all of baseball. In 2003, Buck moved farther up prospect lists. He was listed as the 21st-best prospect in baseball by John Sickels.

Kansas City Royals
On June 24, 2004, the Astros traded him to the Kansas City Royals as part of a three-way deal to acquire Carlos Beltrán, sending Buck and cash to Kansas City and Octavio Dotel to the Oakland Athletics. Mark Teahen and Mike Wood went from the Athletics to the Royals as well. The Royals immediately put Buck in their starting lineup, replacing injured veteran Benito Santiago. Buck made his major league debut on June 25. Although he initially appeared overmatched by major-league pitching—his batting average reached a low of .138 on July 7—he impressed the team with his defensive ability and his handling of pitchers. His hitting improved with time, and by September 25 he had raised his average to .243 with 12 home runs, and 30 RBIs.

In 2006, Buck fought with teammate Runelvys Hernández in the Royals dugout during a game against the Indians.

Toronto Blue Jays

On December 16, 2009, Buck signed a one-year contract with the Toronto Blue Jays worth $2 million. On April 29, 2010. Buck hit 3 home runs in a single game against the Oakland Athletics. Buck was elected to the 2010 American League All-Star team on July 4, along with fellow Blue Jays Vernon Wells and José Bautista. In his first All-Star Game, he went 1–2 with a double. Buck finished his only season in Toronto with career-highs in batting average (.281), hits (115), home runs (20), RBI (66), doubles (25), slugging percentage (.489), and on-base plus slugging (.802).

Florida/Miami Marlins
Buck agreed to a three-year contract with the Florida Marlins worth $18 million on November 15, 2010. The deal was confirmed on November 17, 2010. In his first game with the Marlins, he hit a grand slam off New York Mets pitcher Mike Pelfrey.

In 2011, he had the lowest percentage of runners caught stealing of all major league catchers, at 17%.

In 2012, Buck hit .192/.297/.347 with 12 home runs and 41 RBI in 106 games while throwing out 27% of runners.

New York Mets
On November 19, 2012, Buck was traded to the Toronto Blue Jays along with Josh Johnson, José Reyes, Mark Buehrle, and Emilio Bonifacio, in exchange for Jeff Mathis, Adeiny Hechavarria, Henderson Álvarez, Yunel Escobar, Jake Marisnick, Anthony DeSclafani, and Justin Nicolino. On December 17, 2012, the Blue Jays traded him, Noah Syndergaard, Travis d'Arnaud, and Wuilmer Becerra to the New York Mets for R. A. Dickey,  Josh Thole, and Mike Nickeas.

Buck began 2013 as the starting catcher, with Anthony Recker as his backup. After a great April in which he hit .241/.269/.575 with 9 home runs and 25 RBI, Buck cooled down some. On August 17, Buck was placed on paternity leave, and he was replaced on the roster by the catcher he was traded with, Travis d'Arnaud. d'Arnaud took the starting role when Buck returned, and Buck would soon be traded.

Pittsburgh Pirates
On August 27, 2013, Buck and Marlon Byrd were traded to the Pittsburgh Pirates in exchange for infield prospect Dilson Herrera and a player to be named later, identified on August 29 as Vic Black. He finished the season as the backup to Russell Martin. In 110 games total (9 with Pittsburgh), he hit .219/.285/.362 with 15 home runs and 62 RBI.

Seattle Mariners
On January 14, 2014, Buck agreed to a 1-year, $1 million deal with the Seattle Mariners. He was projected to split time at catcher with Humberto Quintero and Mike Zunino. On July 7, Buck's 34th birthday, the Mariners designated him for assignment. After clearing waivers unclaimed, Buck became a free agent.

Los Angeles Angels of Anaheim
Buck was signed to a minor league contract by the Los Angeles Angels on July 21, 2014. He was assigned to the Triple-A Salt Lake Bees. The Angels designated Buck for assignment on October 7, 2014, after claiming Alfredo Marte and Roger Kieschnick on waivers. He rejected an assignment to Triple-A, becoming a free agent.

Retirement
In January 2015, Buck agreed to a minor league contract with the Atlanta Braves.  The contract included an invitation to major-league spring training.  Buck was expected to start the 2015 season at Triple-A. However, on March 26, he announced that he was retiring from baseball.

Personal life
Buck's wife Brooke gave birth to twins twelve weeks prematurely in May 2008. The twins' names are Cooper and Brody. In August 2013, his wife gave birth to their third son, Bentley.

In December 2011, Buck assisted in rescuing two elderly women from an overturned car in Sunrise, Florida.

References

External links

1980 births
Living people
American expatriate baseball players in Canada
American League All-Stars
Kansas City Royals players
Toronto Blue Jays players
Florida Marlins players
Miami Marlins players
New York Mets players
Pittsburgh Pirates players
Seattle Mariners players
Los Angeles Angels players
Auburn Doubledays players
Gulf Coast Astros players
Michigan Battle Cats players
Lexington Legends players
Round Rock Express players
New Orleans Zephyrs players
Omaha Royals players
New Hampshire Fisher Cats players
Salt Lake Bees players
Major League Baseball catchers
Baseball players from Wyoming
People from Taylorsville, Utah
Baseball players from Utah
People from Kemmerer, Wyoming